The Duncan Canal is a naturally occurring inland waterway in the Alexander Archipelago in Alaska, United States.  It deeply penetrates Kupreanof Island, separating the Lindenberg Peninsula, on the southeast side of the island from the main island.  It was first charted in 1793 by James Johnstone, one of George Vancouver's officers during his 1791-95 expedition. It was named after the English missionary William Duncan.

The Duncan Canal Portage is a popular hiking trail across the northern end of the Lindenberg Peninsula.  It originally provided access to the northern end of the Duncan Canal directly from Frederick Sound.

Butterworth Island is located at the mouth of the Duncan Canal where it debouches into the Sumner Strait past the larger Woewodski Island.

References

External links
 Wright, Fred Eugene and Wright, Charles Will (1908) "Duncan Canal" The Ketchikan and Wrangell Mining Districts, Alaska Bulletin 347, United States Geological Survey, Government Printing Office, Washington, D.C., pp. 140-142, 
 Karl, Susan M.; Haeussler, Peter J. and McCafferty,  Anne (1999) "Reconnaissance Geologic Map of the Duncan Canal-Zarembo Island Area, Southeastern Alaska" U.S. Geological Survey Open-File Report 99–168. 
 "Duncan Canal", text and pictures of radio installation at Indian Point, Duncan Canal, from Internet Archive
 "Duncan Canal Volcano Satellite Images - ASTER Volcano Archive" NASA
 "Duncan Canal Webcam" from Bay TV

Alexander Archipelago
Bodies of water of Petersburg Borough, Alaska
Straits of Alaska